The 2021 Oakland Athletics season was the 121st season for the Oakland Athletics franchise, all as members of the American League. It was also their 54th season in Oakland (all at Oakland Coliseum) which equaled the amount of seasons that they played in their original city of Philadelphia.

Regular season

Standings

American League West

American League Wild Card

Record against opponents

Game log

|- style="background:#fbb;"
| 1 || April 1 || Astros || 1–8 || Greinke (1–0) || Bassitt (0–1) || — || 10,436 || 0–1 || L1
|- style="background:#fbb;"
| 2 || April 2 || Astros || 5–9 || Abreu (1–0) || Luzardo (0–1) || — || 5,446 || 0–2 || L2
|- style="background:#fbb;"
| 3 || April 3 || Astros || 1–9 || McCullers Jr. (1–0) || Irvin (0–1) || Raley (1) || 5,803 || 0–3 || L3
|- style="background:#fbb;"
| 4 || April 4 || Astros || 2–9 || Bielak (1–0) || Manaea (0–1)|| — || 4,504 || 0–4 || L4
|- style="background:#fbb;"
| 5 || April 5 || Dodgers || 3–10 || May (1–0) || Montas (0–1) || — || 6,653 || 0–5 || L5
|- style="background:#fbb;"
| 6 || April 6 || Dodgers || 1–5 || Kershaw (1–1) || Bassitt (0–2) || – || 7,672 || 0–6 || L6
|- style="background:#bfb;"
| 7 || April 7 || Dodgers || 4–3  || Petit (1–0) || Nelson (0–1) || — || 8,131 || 1–6 || W1
|- style="background:#fbb;"
| 8 || April 8 || @ Astros || 2–6 || Javier (1–0) || Irvin (0–2) || — || 21,765 || 1–7 || L1
|- style="background:#bfb;"
| 9 || April 9 || @ Astros || 6–2 || Petit (2–0) || Abreu (1–1) || — || 21,768 || 2–7 || W1
|- style="background:#bfb;"
| 10 || April 10 || @ Astros || 7–3 || Montas (1–1) || Urquidy (0–1) || — || 21,760 || 3–7 || W2
|- style="background:#bfb;"
| 11 || April 12 || @ Diamondbacks || 9–5 || Bassitt (1–2) || Bumgarner (0–2) || — || 8,768 || 4–7 || W3
|- style="background:#bfb;"
| 12 || April 13 || @ Diamondbacks || 7–5 || Petit (3–0) || Swarzak (0–1) || Trivino (1) || 7,010 || 5–7 || W4
|- style="background:#bfb;"
| 13 || April 15 || Tigers || 8–4 || Manaea (1–1) || Skubal (0–2) || — || 3,004 || 6–7 || W5
|- style="background:#bfb;"
| 14 || April 16 || Tigers || 3–0 || Montas (2–1) || Ureña (0–3) || Trivino (2) || 4,538 || 7–7 || W6
|- style="background:#bfb;"
| 15 || April 17 || Tigers || 7–0 || Irvin (1–2) || Mize (1–1) || — || 6,931 || 8–7 || W7
|- style="background:#bfb;"
| 16 || April 18 || Tigers || 3–2 || Trivino (1–0) || Soto (1–1) || — || 6,917 || 9–7 || W8 
|- style="background:#bbb;" 
| — || April 19 || Twins || colspan=7| Postponed (COVID-19; Makeup: April 20)
|- style="background:#bfb;"
| 17 || April 20  || Twins || 7–0  || Manaea (2–1) || Shoemaker (1–1) || — || rowspan=2|3,322 || 10–7 || W9
|- style="background:#bfb;"
| 18 || April 20  || Twins || 1–0  || Luzardo (1–1) || Berríos (2–2) || Diekman (1) || 11–7 || W10
|- style="background:#bfb;"
| 19 || April 21 || Twins || 13–12  || Guerra (1–0) || Colomé (1–2) || — || 3,405 || 12–7 || W11
|- style="background:#bfb;"
| 20 || April 23 || @ Orioles || 3–1 || Irvin (2-2) || Lopez (1-3) || Diekman (2) || 7,574 || 13–7 || W12
|- style="background:#bfb;"
| 21 || April 24 || @ Orioles || 7–2 || Bassitt (2–2) || LeBlanc (0–1) || — || 7,616 || 14–7 || W13
|- style="background:#fbb;"
| 22 || April 25 || @ Orioles || 1–8 || Means (2–0) || Luzardo (1–2) || — || 8,107 || 14–8 || L1
|- style="background:#bfb;"
| 23 || April 26 || @ Rays || 2–1 || Manaea (3–1) || Hill (1–1) || Trivino (3) || 2,981 || 15–8 || W1
|- style="background:#fbb;"
| 24 || April 27 || @ Rays || 3–4 || Springs (1–0) || Montas (2–2) || Castillo (5) || 2,924 || 15–9 || L1
|- style="background:#fbb;"
| 25 || April 28 || @ Rays || 0–2 || Glasnow (3–1) || Irvin (2–3) || Castillo (6) || 3,374 || 15–10 || L2
|- style="background:#bfb;"
| 26 || April 29 || @ Rays || 3–2 || Diekman (1–0) || Castillo (0–2) || Trivino (4) || 3,737 || 16–10 || W1
|- style="background:#fbb;"
| 27 || April 30 || Orioles || 2–3 || Means (3–0) || Fiers (0–1) || Valdez (6) || 5,777 || 16–11 || L1
|-

|- style="background:#fbb;"
| 28 || May 1 || Orioles || 4–8 || Harvey (3–1) || Luzardo (1–3) || — || 6,469 || 16–12 || L2
|- style="background:#bfb;"
| 29 || May 2 || Orioles || 7–5 || Petit (4–0) || Lakins (1–2) || Trivino (5) || 5,862 || 17–12 || W1
|- style="background:#bfb;"
| 30 || May 3 || Blue Jays || 5–4 || Montas (3–2) || Matz (4–2) || Diekman (3) || 2,944 || 18–12 || W2
|- style="background:#bfb;"
| 31 || May 4 || Blue Jays || 4–1 || Irvin (3–3) || Kay (0–2) || Petit (1) || 2,970 || 19–12 || W3
|- style="background:#fbb;"
| 32 || May 5 || Blue Jays || 4–9 || Romano (3–1) || Trivino (1–1) || — || 2,893 || 19–13 || L1
|- style="background:#fbb;"
| 33 || May 6 || Blue Jays || 4–10 || Ryu (2–2) || Fiers (0–2) || — || 3,611 || 19–14 || L2
|- style="background:#bfb;"
| 34 || May 7 || Rays || 2–1 || Diekman (2–0) || Springs (2–1) || — || 5,058 || 20–14 || W1
|- style="background:#bfb;"
| 35 || May 8 || Rays || 6–3 || Montas (4–2) || Glasnow (4–2) || Trivino (6) || 7,707 || 21–14 || W2
|- style="background:#fbb;"
| 36 || May 9 || Rays || 3–4 || Springs (3–1) || Irvin (3–4) || Kittredge (2) || 6,911 || 21–15 || L1
|- style="background:#bfb;"
| 37 || May 11 || @ Red Sox || 3–2 || Bassitt (3–2) || Hernández (0–2) || Diekman (4) || 9,264 || 22–15 || W1
|- style="background:#bfb;"
| 38 || May 12 || @ Red Sox || 4–1 || Kaprielian (1–0) || Rodríguez (5–1) || Diekman (5) || 9,272 || 23–15 || W2
|- style="background:#fbb;"
| 39 || May 13 || @ Red Sox || 1–8 || Richards (3–2) || Manaea (3–2) || Whitlock (1) || 9,301 || 23–16 || L1
|- style="background:#bfb;"
| 40 || May 14 || @ Twins || 6–1 || Montas (5–2) || Shoemaker (2–4) || — || 9,778 || 24–16 || W1
|- style="background:#fbb;"
| 41 || May 15 || @ Twins || 4–5 || Colomé (2–3) || Diekman (2–1) || Robles (1) || 12,212 || 24–17 || L1
|- style="background:#bfb;"
| 42 || May 16 || @ Twins || 7–6 || Trivino (2–1) || Rogers (0–2) || — || 10,270 || 25–17 || W1
|- style="background:#bfb;"
| 43 || May 18 || Astros || 6–5 || Petit (5–0) || Abreu (2–2) || — || 4,838 || 26–17 || W2
|- style="background:#fbb;"
| 44 || May 19 || Astros || 1–8 || Greinke (4–1) || Montas (5–3) || — || 3,925 || 26–18 || L1
|- style="background:#fbb;"
| 45 || May 20 || Astros || 4–8 || García (2–3) || Irvin (3–5) || — || 4,562 || 26–19 || L2
|- style="background:#bfb;"
| 46 || May 21 || @ Angels || 8–4 || Petit (6–0) || Mayers (1–3) || — || 14,624 || 27–19 || W1
|- style="background:#bfb;"
| 47 || May 22 || @ Angels || 6–2 || Bassitt (4–2) || Sandoval (0–1) || — || 15,151 || 28–19 || W2
|- style="background:#fbb;"
| 48 || May 23 || @ Angels || 5–6 || Iglesias (3–2) || Guerra (1–1) || — || 15,154 || 28–20 || L1
|- style="background:#fbb;"
| 49 || May 24 || Mariners || 2–4 || Kikuchi (2–3) || Montas (5–4) || Middleton (3) || 3,019 || 28–21 || L2
|- style="background:#fbb;"
| 50 || May 25 || Mariners || 3–4 || Sewald (2–0) || Irvin (3–6) || Montero (6) || 2,865 || 28–22 || L3
|- style="background:#bfb;"
| 51 || May 26 || Mariners || 6–3 || Kaprielian (2–0) || Dugger (0–1) || Diekman (6) || 3,571 || 29–22 || W1
|- style="background:#bfb;"
| 52 || May 27 || Angels || 5–0 || Bassitt (5–2) || Slegers (2–2) || — || 5,487 || 30–22 || W2
|- style="background:#bfb;"
| 53 || May 28 || Angels || 3–1 || Petit (7–0) || Ohtani (1–1) || Trivino (7) || 8,757 || 31–22 || W3
|- style="background:#fbb;"
| 54 || May 29 || Angels || 0–4 || Cobb (3–2) || Montas (5–5) || — || 9,433 || 31–23 || L1
|- style="background:#fbb;"
| 55 || May 30 || Angels || 2–4 || Suárez (2–0) || Irvin (3–7) || Iglesias (9) || 10,029 || 31–24 || L2
|- style="background:#fbb;"
| 56 || May 31 || @ Mariners || 5–6  || Zamora (2–0) || Trivino (2–2) || — || 11,112 || 31–25 || L3
|-

|- style="background:#bfb;"
| 57 || June 1 || @ Mariners || 12–6 || Luzardo (2–3) || Sewald (2–1) || — || 9,160 || 32–25 || W1
|- style="background:#bfb;"
| 58 || June 2 || @ Mariners || 6–0 || Manaea (4–2) || Flexen (5–3) || — || 9,588 || 33–25 || W2
|- style="background:#bfb;"
| 59 || June 4 || @ Rockies || 9–5 || Montas (6–5) || Gray (4–6) || — || 26,790 || 34–25 || W3
|- style="background:#bfb;"
| 60 || June 5 || @ Rockies || 6–3 || Irvin (4–7) || Freeland (0–1) || Trivino (8) || 27,459 || 35–25 || W4
|- style="background:#fbb;"
| 61 || June 6 || @ Rockies || 1–3 || Márquez (4–5) || Kaprielian (2–1) || Bard (7) || 23,716 || 35–26 || L1
|- style="background:#bfb;"
| 62 || June 8 || Diamondbacks || 5–2 || Bassitt (6–2) || Duplantier (0–2) || Trivino (9) || 3,695 || 36–26 || W1
|- style="background:#bfb;"
| 63 || June 9 || Diamondbacks || 4–0 || Manaea (5–2) || Peacock (2–3) || — || 4,090 || 37–26 || W2
|- style="background:#fbb;"
| 64 || June 10 || Royals || 1–6 || Minor (5–3) || Montas (6–6) || — || 3,211 || 37–27 || L1
|- style="background:#bfb;"
| 65 || June 11 || Royals || 4–3 || Trivino (3–2) || Barlow (2–2) || — || 6,964 || 38–27 || W1
|- style="background:#bfb;"
| 66 || June 12 || Royals || 11–2 || Kaprielian (3–1) || Kowar (0–2) || — || 7,678 || 39–27 || W2
|- style="background:#bfb;"
| 67 || June 13 || Royals || 6–3 || Bassitt (7–2) || Bubic (1–2) || Trivino (10) || 7,060 || 40–27 || W3
|- style="background:#bfb;"
| 68 || June 14 || Angels || 8–5 || Manaea (6–2) || Bundy (1–7) || Trivino (11) || 4,102 || 41–27 || W4
|- style="background:#bfb;"
| 69 || June 15 || Angels || 6–4 || Montas (7–6) || Heaney (4–4) || Petit (2) || 4,942 || 42–27 || W5
|- style="background:#bfb;"
| 70 || June 16 || Angels || 8–4 || Smith (1–0) || Watson (2–3) || — || 6,228 || 43–27 || W6
|- style="background:#bfb;"
| 71 || June 18 || @ Yankees || 5–3 || Kaprielian (4–1) || Peralta (3–2) || Trivino (12) || 24,037 || 44–27 || W7
|- style="background:#fbb;"
| 72 || June 19 || @ Yankees || 5–7 || Green (2–4) || Luzardo (2–4) || Chapman (15) || 23,985 || 44–28 || L1
|- style="background:#fbb;"
| 73 || June 20 || @ Yankees || 1–2 || Loáisiga (7–2) || Manaea (6–3) || Chapman (16) || 27,807 || 44–29 || L2
|- style="background:#fbb;" 
| 74 || June 21 || @ Rangers || 3–8 || Gibson (5–0) || Montas (7–7) || — || 20,259 || 44–30 || L3
|- style="background:#bfb;"
| 75 || June 22 || @ Rangers || 13–6 || Irvin (5–7) || Hearn (2–2) || — || 19,185 || 45–30 || W1
|- style="background:#fbb;" 
| 76 || June 23 || @ Rangers || 3–5 || Martin (2–2) || Petit (7–1) || Rodríguez (1) || 21,829 || 45–31 || L1
|- style="background:#bfb;"
| 77 || June 24 || @ Rangers || 5–1 || Bassitt (8–2) || Allard (2–3) || — || 20,432 || 46–31 || W1
|- style="background:#fbb;"
| 78 || June 25 || @ Giants || 0–2 || Cueto (6–3) || Manaea (6–4) || McGee (15) || 36,928 || 46–32 || L1
|- style="background:#fbb;"
| 79 || June 26 || @ Giants || 5–6  || McGee (3–2) || Smith (1–1) || — || 33,168 || 46–33 || L2
|- style="background:#bfb;"
| 80 || June 27 || @ Giants || 6–2 || Irvin (6–7) || Long (1–1) || — || 35,920 || 47–33 || W1
|- style="background:#fbb;"
| 81 || June 29 || Rangers || 4–5 || Foltynewicz (2–7) || Kaprielian (4–2) || Kennedy (14) || 4,739 || 47–34 || L1
|- style="background:#bfb;"
| 82 || June 30 || Rangers || 3–1 || Bassitt (9–2) || Allard (2–4) || Trivino (13) || 4,320 || 48–34 || W1
|-

|- style="background:#fbb;"
| 83 || July 1 || Rangers || 3–8 || King (6–5) || Manaea (6–5) || — || 5,182 || 48–35 || L1
|- style="background:#fbb;"
| 84 || July 2 || Red Sox || 2–3  || Barnes (4–2) || Trivino (3–3) || Ottavino (6) || 32,304 || 48–36 || L2
|- style="background:#bfb;"
| 85 || July 3 || Red Sox || 7–6  || Wendelken (1–0) || Andriese (2–3) || — || 16,297 || 49–36 || W1
|- style="background:#fbb;"
| 86 || July 4 || Red Sox || 0–1 || Pivetta (7–3) || Kaprielian (4–3) || Barnes (19) || 13,070 || 49–37 || L1
|- style="background:#fbb;"
| 87 || July 6 || @ Astros || 6–9 || Abreu (3–3) || Wendelken (1–1) || Pressly (15) || 26,353 || 49–38 || L2
|- style="background:#fbb;"
| 88 || July 7 || @ Astros || 3–4 || Taylor (2–2) || Manaea (6–6) || Pressly (16) || 21,150 || 49–39 || L3
|- style="background:#bfb;"
| 89 || July 8 || @ Astros || 2–1 || Montas (8–7) || McCullers Jr. (6–2) || Diekman (7) || 29,243 || 50–39 || W1
|- style="background:#fbb;"
| 90 || July 9 || @ Rangers || 2–3 || Lyles (5–5) || Irvin (6–8) || Kennedy (15) || 29,619 || 50–40 || L1
|- style="background:#bfb;"
| 91 || July 10 || @ Rangers || 8–4  || Wendelken (2–1) || Patton (0–1) || — || 30,030 || 51–40 || W1
|- style="background:#bfb;"
| 92 || July 11 || @ Rangers || 4–1 || Bassitt (10–2) || Allard (2–6) || Trivino (14) || 30,531 || 52–40 || W2
|-style=background:#bbbfff
||-|| July 13 || colspan="8"|91st All-Star Game in Denver, CO
|- style="background:#bfb;"
| 93 || July 16 || Indians || 5–4 || Romo (1–0) || Clase (3–5) || — || 12,361 || 53–40 || W3
|- style="background:#fbb;"
| 94 || July 17 || Indians || 2–3 || Quantrill (2–2) || Montas (8–8) || Karinchak (10) || 11,374 || 53–41 || L1
|- style="background:#fbb;"
| 95 || July 18 || Indians || 2–4 || Plesac (5–3) || Bassitt (10–3) || Shaw (2) || 8,572 || 53–42 || L2
|- style="background:#bfb;"
| 96 || July 19 || Angels || 4–1 || Irvin (7–8) || Cishek (0–1) || Trivino (15) || 14,856 || 54–42 || W1
|- style="background:#bfb;"
| 97 || July 20 || Angels || 6–0 || Kaprielian (5–3) || Suárez (4–3) || — || 9,154 || 55–42 || W2
|- style="background:#bfb;"
| 98 || July 22 || @ Mariners || 4–1 || Manaea (7–6) || Flexen (9–4) || Trivino (16) || 18,553 || 56–42 || W3
|- style="background:#fbb;"
| 99 || July 23 || @ Mariners || 3–4 || Sewald (6–2) || Diekman (2–2) || Graveman (10) || 21,312 || 56–43 || L1
|- style="background:#fbb;"
| 100 || July 24 || @ Mariners || 4–5 || Graveman (3–0) || Trivino (3–4) || — || 30,843 || 56–44 || L2
|- style="background:#fbb;"
| 101 || July 25 || @ Mariners || 3–4 || Gonzales (3–5) || Irvin (7–9) || Steckenrider (3) || 21,501 || 56–45 || L3
|- style="background:#fbb;"
| 102 || July 27 || @ Padres || 4–7 || Paddack (7–6) || Kaprielian (5–4) || Melancon (31) || 40,162 || 56–46 || L4
|- style="background:#bfb;"
| 103 || July 28 || @ Padres || 10–4 || Manaea (8–6) || Snell (4–4) || — || 35,351 || 57–46 || W1
|- style="background:#bfb;"
| 104 || July 29 || @ Angels || 4–0 || Montas (9–8) || Bundy (1–8) || — || 18,631 || 58–46 || W2
|- style="background:#bfb;"
| 105 || July 30 || @ Angels || 2–0 || Bassitt (11–3) || Sandoval (3–5) || Trivino (17) || 28,861 || 59–46 || W3
|- style="background:#fbb;"
| 106 || July 31 || @ Angels || 0–1 || Barría (2–0) || Irvin (7–10) || Iglesias (22) || 23,207 || 59–47 || L1
|-

|- style="background:#bfb;"
| 107 || August 1 || @ Angels || 8–3 || Jefferies (1–0) || Detmers (0–1) || — || 21,597 || 60–47 || W1
|- style="background:#fbb;"
| 108 || August 3 || Padres || 1–8 || Snell (5–4) || Manaea (8–7) || — || 11,985 || 60–48 || L1
|- style="background:#bfb;"
| 109 || August 4 || Padres || 5–4  || Trivino (4–4) || Hill (5–6) || — || 10,648 || 61–48 || W1
|- style="background:#bfb;"
| 110 || August 6 || Rangers || 4–1  || Petit (8–1) || Herget (0–1) || — || 9,022 || 62–48 || W2
|- style="background:#bfb;"
| 111 || August 7 || Rangers || 12–3 || Irvin (8–10) || Anderson (0–1) || — || 10,082 || 63–48 || W3
|- style="background:#bfb;"
| 112 || August 8 || Rangers || 6–3 || Kaprielian (6–4) || Lyles (5–9) || Trivino (18) || 9,548 || 64–48 || W4
|- style="background:#bfb;"
| 113 || August 10 || @ Indians || 4–3  || Trivino (5–4) || Wittgren (2–5) || Chafin (1) || 13,041 || 65–48 || W5
|- style="background:#bfb;"
| 114 || August 11 || @ Indians || 6–3 || Diekman (3–2) || Sandlin (1–1) || Trivino (19) || 13,560 || 66–48 || W6
|- style="background:#bfb;"
| 115 || August 12 || @ Indians || 17–0 || Bassitt (12–3) || Morgan (1–5) || — || 16,559 || 67–48 || W7
|- style="background:#fbb;”
| 116 || August 13 || @ Rangers || 6–8 || Santana (2–2) || Irvin (8–11) || Barlow (1) || 26,761 || 67–49 || L1
|- style="background:#bfb;"
| 117 || August 14 || @ Rangers || 8–3 || Chafin (1–2) || Lyles (5–10) || — || 31,904 || 68–49 || W1
|- style="background:#fbb;"
| 118 || August 15 || @ Rangers || 4–7 || Allard (3–10) || Manaea (8–8) || Barlow (2) || 24,990 || 68–50 || L1
|- style="background:#fbb;"
| 119 || August 16 || @ White Sox || 2–5 || Keuchel (8–6) || Montas (9–9) || Hendriks (27) || 19,410 || 68–51 || L2
|- style="background:#fbb;"
| 120 || August 17 || @ White Sox || 0–9 || López (2–0) || Bassitt (12–4) || — || 21,025 || 68–52 || L3
|- style="background:#fbb;"
| 121 || August 18 || @ White Sox || 2–3 || Crochet (3–5) || Blackburn (0–1) || Hendriks (28) || 22,780 || 68–53 || L4
|- style="background:#bfb;"
| 122 || August 19 || @ White Sox || 5–4 || Irvin (9–11) || Kopech (3–2) || Trivino (20) || 23,853 || 69–53 || W1
|- style="background:#bfb;"
| 123 || August 20 || Giants || 4–1 || Kaprielian (7–4) || Wood (10–4) || Trivino (21) || 40,133 || 70–53 || W2
|- style="background:#fbb;"
| 124 || August 21 || Giants || 5–6 || Rogers (4–1) || Trivino (5–5) || McGee (27) || 36,230 || 70–54 || L1
|- style="background:#fbb;"
| 125 || August 22 || Giants || 1–2 || Leone (3–2) || Puk (0–1) || McGee (28) || 30,345 || 70–55 || L2
|- style="background:#fbb;"
| 126 || August 23 || Mariners || 3–5 || Misiewicz (4–4) || Trivino (5–6) || Sewald (7) || 4,140 || 70–56 || L3
|- style="background:#fbb;"
| 127 || August 24 || Mariners || 1–5 || Flexen (11–5) || Irvin (9–12) || Steckenrider (6) || 4,508 || 70–57 || L4
|- style="background:#fbb;"
| 128 || August 26 || Yankees || 6–7 || Loáisiga (9–4) || Trivino (5–7) || Chapman (24) || 8,147 || 70–58 || L5
|- style="background:#fbb;"
| 129 || August 27 || Yankees || 2–8 || Cole (13–6) || Manaea (8–9) || — || 22,463 || 70–59 || L6
|- style="background:#bfb;"
| 130 || August 28 || Yankees || 3–2 || Montas (10–9) || Cortés Jr. (2–2) || Romo (1) || 18,337 || 71–59 || W1
|- style="background:#bfb;"
| 131 || August 29 || Yankees || 3–1 || Guerra (2–1) || Green (7–6) || Chafin (2) || 18,468 || 72–59 || W2
|- style="background:#bfb;"
| 132 || August 31 || @ Tigers || 9–3 || Guerra (3–1) || Skubal (8–12) || — || 13,853 || 73–59 || W3
|-

|- style="background:#fbb;"
| 133 || September 1 || @ Tigers || 6–8 || Jiménez (5–1) || Puk (0–2) || Soto (17) || 12,593 || 73–60 || L1
|- style="background:#bfb;"
| 134 || September 2 || @ Tigers || 8–6 || Montas (11–9) || Manning (3–6) || Romo (2) || 11,623 || 74–60 || W1
|- style="background:#fbb;"
| 135 || September 3 || @ Blue Jays || 10–11 || Romano (7–1) || Romo (1–1) || — || 14,843 || 74–61 || L1
|- style="background:#fbb;"
| 136 || September 4 || @ Blue Jays || 8–10 || Berríos (10–7) || Blackburn (0–2) || — || 14,947 || 74–62 || L2
|- style="background:#fbb;" 
| 137 || September 5 || @ Blue Jays || 0–8 || Ray (11–5) || Irvin (9–13) || — || 14,988 || 74–63 || L3
|- style="background:#fbb;"
| 138 || September 7 || White Sox || 3–6 || Lambert (1–1) || Puk (0–3) || Hendriks (33) || 4,556 || 74–64 || L4
|- style="background:#bfb;"
| 139 || September 8 || White Sox || 5–1 || Montas (12–9) || Keuchel (8–9) || — || 8,147 || 75–64 || W1
|- style="background:#bfb;"
| 140 || September 9 || White Sox || 3–1 || Manaea (9–9) || López (3–2) || Chafin (3) || 5,078 || 76–64 || W2
|- style="background:#bfb;"
| 141 || September 10 || Rangers || 10–5 || Guerra (4–1) || Otto (0–1) || — || 7,157 || 77–64 || W3
|- style="background:#fbb;"
| 142 || September 11 || Rangers || 6–8 || Martin (4–4) || Chafin (1–3) || Barlow (5) || 7,945 || 77–65 || L1
|- style="background:#fbb;"
| 143 || September 12 || Rangers || 3–4 || Hearn (6–4) || Kaprielian (7–5) || Barlow (6) || 6,983 || 77–66 || L2
|- style="background:#fbb;"
| 144 || September 14 || @ Royals || 7–10 || Brentz (5–2) || Petit (8–2) || Barlow (13) || 10,254 || 77–67 || L3
|- style="background:#bfb;"
| 145 || September 15 || @ Royals || 12–10 || Manaea (10–9) || Hernández (6–2) || Chafin (4) || 11,056 || 78–67 || W1
|- style="background:#bfb;"
| 146 || September 16 || @ Royals || 7–2 || Blackburn (1–2) || Lynch (4–5) || — || 11,729 || 79–67 || W2
|- style="background:#bfb;"
| 147 || September 17 || @ Angels || 5–4 || Irvin (10–13) || Marte (0–1) || Romo (3) || 18,918 || 80–67 || W3
|- style="background:#bfb;"
| 148 || September 18 || @ Angels || 3–1 || Kaprielian (8–5) || Suárez (7–8) || Chafin (5) || 27,150 || 81–67 || W4
|- style="background:#bfb;"
| 149 || September 19 || @ Angels || 3–2  || Trivino (6–7) || Iglesias (7–5) || — || 22,456 || 82–67 || W5
|- style="background:#fbb;"
| 150 || September 20 || Mariners || 2–4 || Anderson (7–9) || Manaea (10–10) || Sewald (9) || 4,068 || 82–68 || L1
|- style="background:#fbb;"
| 151 || September 21 || Mariners || 2–5 || Gonzales (9–5) || Blackburn (1–3) || Steckenrider (10) || 4,246 || 82–69 || L2
|- style="background:#fbb;"
| 152 || September 22 || Mariners || 1–4 || Flexen (13–6) || Irvin (10–14) || Steckenrider (11) || 4,149 || 82–70 || L3
|- style="background:#fbb;" 
| 153 || September 23 || Mariners || 5–6 || Smith (3–4) || Diekman (3–3) || Sewald (10) || 4,966 || 82–71 || L4
|- style="background:#bfb;"
| 154 || September 24 || Astros || 14–2 || Montas (13–9) || Bielak (3–4) || — || 21,105 || 83–71 || W1
|- style="background:#bfb;"
| 155 || September 25 || Astros || 2–1 || Chafin (2–3) || Pressly (5–3) || — || 13,037 || 84–71 || W2
|- style="background:#bfb;"
| 156 || September 26 || Astros || 4–3 || Trivino (7–7) || Stanek (3–5) || — || 12,288 || 85–71 || W3
|- style="background:#fbb;"
| 157 || September 27 || @ Mariners || 4–13 || Flexen (14–6) || Irvin (10–15) || — || 11,169 || 85–72 || L1
|- style="background:#fbb;"
| 158 || September 28 || @ Mariners || 2–4 || Misiewicz (5–5) || Petit (8–3) || Steckenrider (12) || 12,635 || 85–73 || L2
|- style="background:#fbb;"
| 159 || September 29 || @ Mariners || 2–4 || Castillo (5–5) || Chafin (2–4) || Steckenrider (13) || 17,366 || 85–74 || L3
|-

|- style="background:#bfb;"
| 160 || October 1 || @ Astros || 8–6 || Manaea (11–10) || Valdez (11–6) || Trivino (22) || 26,672 || 86–74 || W1
|- style="background:#fbb;"
| 161 || October 2 || @ Astros || 4–10 || Maton (6–0) || Blackburn (1–4) || — || 29,208 || 86–75 || L1
|- style="background:#fbb;"
| 162 || October 3 || @ Astros || 6–7 || Taylor (4–4) || Trivino (7–8) || — || 29,752 || 86–76 || L2
|-

|- style="text-align:center;"
| Legend:       = Win       = Loss       = PostponementBold = Athletics team member

Roster

Statistics

Batting
List does not include pitchers. Stats in bold are the team leaders.

Note: G = Games played; AB = At bats; R = Runs; H = Hits; 2B = Doubles; 3B = Triples; HR = Home runs; RBI = Runs batted in; BB = Walks; SO = Strikeouts; SB = Stolen bases; Avg. = Batting average; OBP = On-base percentage; SLG = Slugging percentage; OPS = On Base + Slugging

Pitching
List does not include position players. Stats in bold are the team leaders.

Note: W = Wins; L = Losses; ERA = Earned run average; G = Games pitched; GS = Games started; SV = Saves; IP = Innings pitched; R = Total runs allowed; ER = Earned runs allowed; BB = Walks allowed; K = Strikeouts

Farm system

Source:

References

External links
2021 Oakland Athletics season at Baseball Reference

Oakland Athletics seasons
Oakland Athletics
2020s in Oakland, California
Oakland Athletics